Neil Dexter (born 29 April 1955) is a British former swimmer.

Swimming career
He competed in two events at the 1972 Summer Olympics.

He represented England and won a silver medal in the 4 x 100 metres freestyle relay, at the 1974 British Commonwealth Games in Christchurch, New Zealand.

References

External links
 

1955 births
Living people
British male swimmers
Olympic swimmers of Great Britain
Swimmers at the 1972 Summer Olympics
Place of birth missing (living people)
Commonwealth Games medallists in swimming
Commonwealth Games silver medallists for England
Swimmers at the 1974 British Commonwealth Games
Medallists at the 1974 British Commonwealth Games